Jamestown is a village in Strathpeffer (and formerly of 'Ross-shire'), Scottish Highlands and is in the Scottish council area of Highland.

References

Populated places in Ross and Cromarty